The GRAM 63 is a prototype battle rifle that was in trials to replace the semi-automatic Ag m/42 in Swedish Army service and was manufactured by Bofors Carl Gustaf. However, it lost to the license-produced H&K G3 known as the Ak 4.

See also
Service rifle
FM 1957 battle rifle
Ak 5, the Ak 4's replacement and current service rifle of the Swedish Armed Forces.

External links

 Swedish military assault rifles 1945 - 1990, Ak4 and Ak 5.
 GRAM 63 receiver
 GRAM 63 rifle

7.62×51mm NATO battle rifles
Rifles of Sweden
Rifles of the Cold War